Free the Robots (born Chris Alfaro) is an underground hip hop producer from Los Angeles, California.

Style
Free the Robots pulls together jazz, dubstep, psychedelic music, electronic music and hip hop.

History
Free the Robots started as a side project by Chris Alfaro in 2003, while also playing with different bands, DJing, and producing tracks for MC's with the use of samples, controllers, and other live instruments. He is known as one of the pioneering artists to come out of LA's beat movement and has shared stages with the likes of Prefuse 73, Flying Lotus, DJ Shadow, Afrika Bambaataa and more. His second album Ctrl Alt Del, which features Isaiah "Ikey" Owens, was released on Alpha Pup Records in 2010.

Discography

Albums
 Prototype (2005)
 Japanese exclusive (2008)
 Ctrl Alt Delete (2010)
 The Balance (2013)
 Sempervirens w/ Opio (2015)
 KARAVAN w/ Lefto (2017)
 DATU (2019)
 Kaduwa (2022)

EPs

 Free The Robots EP (2007)
 Free The Robots EP 2 (2010)
 Free The Robots EP 3 (2010)
 The Killer Robots (2008) w/ The Gaslamp Killer
 The Mind's Eye (2011)
 Free the Robots EP Vol. II (2012)
 Free the Robots EP Vol. III (2012)
 In Other Worlds (2013)
 The Balance (2014)
 Two Snakes EP (2015) 
 Subconscious Mind EP (2015) w/ Opio

Productions
 "Least Favorite Rapper" by Busdriver on Jhelli Beam (2009)
 "DSD2" by Nocando on Jimmy the Lock (2010)
 "Unibrow" by Busdriver on Computer Cooties (2010)
 "10 Haters" by Flash Bang Grenada on 10 Haters (2011)
 "Free the Robots" by Capital Steez on AmeriKKKan Korruption (2012)
 "Strange Light" collaboration DJ Krush on Butterfly Effect (2016)
 "Sallem" collaboration Emel Mathlouthi on Ensenity (2018)
 "Sweetness of the New" remix Gray on Limited 7" (2018)

References

External links
 
 
 Free the Robots on Alpha Pup Records
 Free The Robots Interview by VibeRated.com
 Free The Robots mix for the-chemistry.net

American electronic musicians
Living people
Year of birth missing (living people)